TSX-5 (Tri-Service-Experiments mission 5) is an $85 million satellite successfully launched into orbit on June 7, 2000, from Vandenberg Air Force Base on a Pegasus XL rocket.

TSX-5 hosts two Department of Defense (DOD) payloads, STRV-2 (the Space Test Research Vehicle-2), sponsored by the Ballistic Missile Defense Organization, and CEASE (the Compact Environmental Anomaly Sensor), sponsored by the Air Force's Phillips Geophysics Laboratory. TSX-5 is managed by the Space Technology Program (STP) at the Space and Missiles Centre, Test and Evaluation (SMC/TELS) at Kirtland Air Force Base, New Mexico.

References

 https://web.archive.org/web/20070927183303/http://www.aero.org/publications/crosslink/summer2001/04.html 
 https://web.archive.org/web/20061111103443/http://www.spaceandtech.com/digest/flash-articles/flash2000-030.shtml 
 https://web.archive.org/web/20061111115152/http://www.spaceandtech.com/spacedata/logs/2000/2000-030a_tsx-5_sumpub.shtml 
 Spaceflight Now - Pegasus Launch Report - The TSX-5 satellite, June 6, 2000

Satellites orbiting Earth
Spacecraft launched in 2000